Humaid Salmeen (Arabic:حميد سالمين) (born 6 September 1996) is an Emirati footballer who plays as a midfielder.

External links

References

Emirati footballers
1996 births
Living people
Al Ahli Club (Dubai) players
Emirates Club players
Fujairah FC players
Al Dhafra FC players
Al-Wasl F.C. players
Al Urooba Club players
Hatta Club players
Place of birth missing (living people)
UAE First Division League players
UAE Pro League players
Association football midfielders